Eucalyptus semiglobosa is a species of mallee  or small tree that is endemic to the south coast of Western Australia. It has smooth bark, broadly lance-shaped adult leaves, flower buds in groups of seven, creamy white flowers and ribbed or wrinkled, shortened spherical or hemispherical fruit.

Description
It has smooth grey or light brown bark.

Taxonomy and naming
This species was first formally described in 1976 by Ian Brooker in the journal Nuytsia and given the name Eucalyptus goniantha subsp. semiglobosa. In 1992, Lawrie Johnson and Ken Hill raised the subspecies to species status as E. semiglobosa in the journal Telopea and the change has been accepted at the Australian Plant Census. The specific epithet (semiglobosa) is from the Latin semi- meaning "half" and globosa meaning "globose", referring to the operculum.

Distribution and habitat
This eucalypt is found in scattered populated growing on shallow sand over granite between the Cape Le Grand and Cape Arid National Parks in the Esperance Plains and Mallee biogeographic regions.

Conservation status
Eucalyptus semiglobosa is classified as "Priority Three" by the Government of Western Australia Department of Parks and Wildlife meaning that it is poorly known and known from only a few locations but is not under imminent threat.

See also
List of Eucalyptus species

References

Eucalypts of Western Australia
Trees of Australia
semiglobosa
Myrtales of Australia
Plants described in 1976
Taxa named by Ian Brooker